2007

This is a list of Spanish television related events in 2007.

Events 
 15 January: Luis Fernández Fernández is appointed President of Radiotelevisión Española.
 5 July: Conflict between Sogecable and La Sexta about Broadcasting rights of Campeonato Nacional de Liga de Primera División football matches.
 5 November: Break-up of comic duo Cruz y raya.

Debuts

Especiales 
 TVE 
 Ciudadano Kien

Television shows

Ending this year

Changes of network affiliation

Foreign series debuts in Spain

Deaths 
 31 January - Trinidad Rugero, 69, actress.
 6 March - José Luis Coll, 75, comedian & host.
 June - Eva Gloria, 55, hostess.
 19 June - El Fary, 69, singer & actor.
 25 June - Pedro Amalio López, 78, director.
 11 July - Félix Acaso, 88, voice actor.
 21 July - Jesús de Polanco, 77, CEO of Digital +.
 27 August - Emma Penella, 77, actress.
 2 October - Carmen Rossi, 75, actress.
 21 November - Fernando Fernán Gómez, 86, actor & director.
 27 November - Paul Loustau, 29, actor.
 20 December - José Luis Pécker, 80, host.

See also
 2007 in Spain
 List of Spanish films of 2007

References 

2007 in Spanish television